The blacktail wrasse (Thalassoma ballieui), also known as Ballieu's wrasse, is a species of wrasse native to the waters around the Hawaiian Islands and Johnston Island. It can reach  in length. It can also be found in the aquarium trade.

References

Thalassoma
Fish of Hawaii
Fish described in 1875